The military history of the United States during the Korean War began in the context of the defeat of Japan by the Allied Powers in World War II which heralded the end to 35 years of Japanese occupation of the Korean Peninsula and led to the peninsula being divided into two zones; a northern zone occupied by the Soviet Union and a southern zone occupied by the United States. After negotiations on reunification failed, the latter became the Republic of Korea or South Korea in August 1948 while the former became the Democratic People's Republic of Korea or North Korea in September 1948. 

In 1950, a North Korean invasion began the Korean War, which saw extensive U.S.-led U.N. intervention in support of the South, while the North received support from China and from the Soviet Union. Some 1,780,000 Americans served in the war, with 36,574 killed, 103,284 wounded, and 4,714 taken as prisoners of war.

The president of the United States at the start of the war was Harry S. Truman, while at the end of the war the country was led by Dwight Eisenhower, who took over from Truman in January 1953. A controversial event in the war domestically was when President Truman fired General Douglas MacArthur in April 1951. Another point of controversy were the Chinese and North Korean allegations that the U.N. forces engaged in biological warfare. Ultimately, the war became a major issue in the November 1952 presidential election, and aided Eisenhower's victory.

Background
At the conclusion of World War II the Allied nations began the process of disarmament of Axis controlled regions. Japan occupied Korea at this time and had been in control since 1910. In 1945, the decision was made to have American Marines forces oversee Japanese surrender and disarmament south of the 38th parallel and the Soviet Union would facilitate the change of power to the north. At the time there was no political motivation and seemed to be a logical and convenient plan of action. The original agreement and intent was to create a unified and independent Korea out of the post Japanese occupation era. Instead each side of the 38th parallel established its own government under the influence of the occupational country; the United States in South Korea and the Soviet Union in North Korea. Both new Korean governments discredited the other and claimed to be the only legitimate political system. Tensions between the North and South escalated and each side began to petition foreign powers for resources and support. South Korea wanted weapons and supplies from President Truman and the United States government while North Korea sought help from Joseph Stalin and the Soviet Union. The United States was still war weary from the disruptive World War II campaign and refused South Korea's request for weapons and troops. North Korea convinced the Soviet Union to supply them with the weapons and support they requested. This decision coincided with the United States withdrawing the last remaining combat troops from South Korea. North Korea saw its opportunity and attacked South Korean forces at the 38th parallel on June 25, 1950 and thus initiating the Korean War.

Initial response 
In response to North Korea's invasion into South Korea the United Nations convened to formulate a response. The U.N. demanded North Korea's immediate withdrawal and, when this was not met, United States Army General Douglas MacArthur was appointed supreme commander of U.N. forces. To halt the rapid progress of North Korean forces into the south Task Force Smith was deployed to the Korean front from Japan. Task Force Smith consisted of U.S. Army officers and regiments of the Army's 24th Infantry Division that were stationed in Japan as occupational forces. The 24th were under trained, poorly supplied, and outnumbered. The 24th offered very little resistance against the North Korean advance. American and South Korean troops were pushed south and in late July 1950 Task Force Smith was overrun in the city of Taejon. Troops from the Army's 25th Infantry Division were deployed to Taejon to establish a new line and pullout the decimated 24th I.D. This addition of combat troops did not stop the North Korean advance and both American and South Korean troops were pushed further south.

Battle of Osan 

The first battle the Americans entered in the Korean War was the Battle of Osan, where about four hundred U.S. soldiers landed in Busan airport on the first of July, 1950. The American troops were sent off to Taejon the next morning where Major General John H. Church the head of U.S. field headquarters was confident in the US troop's strengths to push back the North Koreans. On July 5 the troops were finally put to the test when North Korean tanks crept towards Osan. The four hundred infantryman of the U.S. also called Task Force Smith opened fire on the North Koreans at 8:16 am. Only four of the North Korean tanks were destroyed and twenty-nine kept moving forward breaking the US line. At the end of the battle only two more North Korean Tanks and two regiments of North Korean infantry were destroyed. The US had lost the battle, revealing that the mere sight of US troops would not reverse the military balance in Korea. By early August, the North Korean troops had pushed back the US and South Korean troops all the way to Naktong River, which is located about thirty miles from Busan. The two weeks of fighting following this resulted in the most casualties of US troops than any other equivalent period of this war. However, during this time the US pushed supplies and personnel to Korea and by the end of July South Koreans and US troops outnumbered the North Koreans, although the North had pushed back the US and South significantly the North had suffered over fifty thousand casualties. Also, because North Korea's supply lines were so lengthy and with the US in control of the water and air replenishing their losses were slow.

Incheon 
Although MacArthur clearly stated that the Battle of Incheon was a 5000 to 1 gamble, it was an important military move to make. Incheon is 25 miles from Seoul on the coast and only once during September is the water even deep enough to allow the 29 foot draft of American LSTs. It was a defenders' best place to allow troops into Korea, and to push the invaders back. On September 15 the 1st Marine Division landed at the port city, taking the defending North Koreans completely by surprise, and by the end of the night over a third of Incheon was taken back.

Japan
During the mid-1940s, Germany and Japan were both at a desperate state caused by World War II. Germany received a sort of benefit from the U.S. as a compensation of war and reconstruction. The Japanese on the other end were devastated by the aftermath. People were suffering, eating out of garbage, and many people starved. Meanwhile, the U.S. troops in the Korean War were in great demand of uniforms and other equipment. The American government turned to Japan for the favor, which eventually stimulated the manufacturing factories that were in jeopardy due to damage caused by World War II. Japan accepted the offer and mainly supplied U.S. troops in Korea with uniforms and other sorts of clothing. Bases were also erected in Japan for U.S. Air Force planes, such as B-29 Superfortress bombers.

References

Further reading
 Caridi, Ronald J. The Korean War and American Politics: The Republican Party as a Case Study (University of Pennsylvania Press, 2016).

 Chen, Jian. China's road to the Korean War: The making of the Sino-American confrontation (Columbia University Press, 1994).
 Dingman, Roger. "Atomic diplomacy during the Korean War." International Security 13.3 (1988): 50-91. online

 Foot, Rosemary. The Wrong War: American Policy and the Dimensions of the Korean Conflict, 1950–1953 (Cornell University Press, 2019).
 Foot, Rosemary J. "Nuclear coercion and the ending of the Korean conflict." International Security 13.3 (1988): 92-112. excerpt

 Fordham, Benjamin. Building the cold war consensus: The political economy of US national security policy, 1949-51 (University of Michigan Press, 1998).
 Halberstam, David. The coldest winter: America and the Korean War (Pan Macmillan, 2009).
 Jackson, Michael Gordon. "Beyond Brinkmanship: Eisenhower, Nuclear War Fighting, and Korea, 1953‐1968." Presidential Studies Quarterly 35.1 (2005): 52-75. 

 Keefer, Edward C. "President Dwight D. Eisenhower and the End of the Korean War." Diplomatic History 10.3 (1986): 267-289. 

 MANTELL, MATTHEW EDWIN. "OPPOSITION TO THE KOREAN WAR: A STUDY IN AMERICAN DISSENT" (PhD dissertation,  New York University ProQuest Dissertations Publishing,  1973. 7319947.
 Medhurst, Martin J. "Text and Context in the 1952 Presidential Campaign: Eisenhower's 'I Shall Go to Korea' Speech." Presidential Studies Quarterly 30.3 (2000): 464-484.
 Millett, Allan R. "Dwight D. Eisenhower and the Korean War: Cautionary Tale and Hopeful Precedent." Journal of American-East Asian Relations 10.3-4 (2001): 155-174.
 Ohanian, Lee E. "The macroeconomic effects of war finance in the United States: World War II and the Korean War." American Economic Review (1997): 23-40. online
 Park, Hong-Kyu. "American involvement in the Korean war." History Teacher 16.2 (1983): 249-263. online
 Parmar, Inderjeet. "Racial and imperial thinking in international theory and politics: Truman, Attlee and the Korean War." British Journal of Politics and International Relations 18.2 (2016): 351-369. online
 Stanley, Elizabeth A. Paths to peace: Domestic coalition shifts, war termination and the Korean War (Stanford University Press, 2009).

 Stueck Jr, William W. The Road to Confrontation: American Policy toward China and Korea (UNC Press Books, 2017).
 Suchman, Edward A., Rose K. Goldsen, and Robin M. Williams Jr. "Attitudes toward the Korean war." Public Opinion Quarterly 17.2 (1953): 171-184. https://doi.org/10.1086/266452 o

 Trachtenberg, Marc. "A" Wasting Asset": American Strategy and the Shifting Nuclear Balance, 1949-1954." International Security 13.3 (1988): 5-49. excerpt
 Tucker, Spencer C., and Paul G. Pierpaoli Jr, eds. The Encyclopedia of the Korean War: A Political, Social, and Military History (3 vol. ABC-CLIO, 2010).

 
 
Korean War
Korean War
Korea–United States relations
Korean War
Korean War
Korean War
Korean War